Chambersville is an unincorporated community in Collin County, located in the U.S. state of Texas. It was founded in 1847 by Elisha and Margaret Chambers who gave land for a school and cemetery.

References

Unincorporated communities in Collin County, Texas
Unincorporated communities in Texas